The dark-throated seedeater (Sporophila ruficollis) is a bird species in the family Thraupidae (formerly in Emberizidae). It is found in Argentina, Bolivia, Brazil, Paraguay, and Uruguay (where it can still be found at the Quebrada de los Cuervos).

Its natural habitats are dry savanna and subtropical or tropical seasonally wet or flooded lowland grassland. It is becoming rare due to habitat loss.

References

dark-throated seedeater
Birds of Argentina
Birds of Paraguay
Birds of Uruguay
dark-throated seedeater
Taxonomy articles created by Polbot